(ADP-ribosyl)hydrolase 1, also termed [Protein ADP-ribosylarginine] hydrolase and protein-Nω-(ADP-D-ribosyl)-L-arginine ADP-ribosylhydrolase, is an enzyme that in humans is encoded by the ADPRH gene. This enzyme is a specific mono(ADP-ribosyl)hydrolase that catalyses the removal of an ADP-ribosyl modification from target arginine residues of protein substrates. The chemical reactions can formally be described as follows:

 Nω-(ADP-D-ribosyl)-L-arginyl-[protein] + H2O  ADP-D-ribose + L-arginyl-[protein]
In addition, the enzyme can reverse the ADP-ribosylation of free arginine:
 Nω-(ADP-D-ribosyl)-L-arginine + H2O  ADP-D-ribose + L-arginine

See also 
ADP-ribosylhydrolase

References

External links 
 

EC 3.2.2